Marlyne Sarah Ngongoa (also written Ngo Ngoa, born 7 July 1983) is a Cameroonian long jumper.

She finished eighth at the 2012 African Championships, fourth at the 2014 African Championships, tenth at the 2014 Commonwealth Games, seventh at the 2015 Military World Games, sixth at the 2015 African Games, won the bronze medal at the 2016 African Championships. and finished sixth at the 2017 Jeux de la Francophonie. At the 2017 Islamic Solidarity Games she won bronze medals in both long jump and 4 x 100 metres relay.

Her personal best jump is 6.52 metres, achieved in the qualifying round at the 2014 Commonwealth Games in Glasgow.

References

1983 births
Living people
Cameroonian female long jumpers
Athletes (track and field) at the 2014 Commonwealth Games
Commonwealth Games competitors for Cameroon
African Games medalists in athletics (track and field)
African Games silver medalists for Cameroon
Athletes (track and field) at the 2015 African Games
Islamic Solidarity Games competitors for Cameroon
Islamic Solidarity Games medalists in athletics
21st-century Cameroonian women